Podgore Saddle (‘Sedlovina Podgore’ \se-dlo-vi-'na pod-'go-re\) is the ice-covered flat saddle of elevation 2250 m linking Tyree Ridge to Bearskin Ridge on the east side of Sentinel Range in Ellsworth Mountains, Antarctica.  It is part of the glacial divide between Patton Glacier and Crosswell Glacier.

The feature is named after the settlement of Podgore in northwestern Bulgaria.

Location

US mapping in 1988.

Maps
 Vinson Massif.  Scale 1:250 000 topographic map.  Reston, Virginia: US Geological Survey, 1988.
 Antarctic Digital Database (ADD). Scale 1:250000 topographic map of Antarctica. Scientific Committee on Antarctic Research (SCAR). Since 1993, regularly updated.

References
 Podgore Saddle. SCAR Composite Antarctic Gazetteer.
 Bulgarian Antarctic Gazetteer. Antarctic Place-names Commission. (details in Bulgarian, basic data in English)

External links
 Podgore Saddle. Copernix satellite image

Mountain passes of Ellsworth Land
Bulgaria and the Antarctic